Kreidler Florett RS was a German moped of Kreidler's Metall- und Drahtwerke G.m.b.H. in Kornwestheim near Stuttgart (Germany), of which 125,000 pieces have been built between 1967 and 1981. The mark Florett RS was the fastest of Kreidler and in comparison to Hercules K 50 and Zündapp KS 50 an equally good choice.

Specifications
Small motorcycles with up to 50 cm³ capacity were exempt from taxes and licence plates and could be driven with a Class 4 driving licence with a minimum age of 16 years. To stop the competitive spiral, the three leading manufactureres Kreidler, Hercules and Zündapp agreed 1970 to a voluntary limitation of the 50-cm³ class to 6,25 PS and a gearbox with a maximum of 5 gears.

Bibliography
 Frank O. Hrachowy: Kreidler. Geschichte-Typen-Technik. (in German) 1. Auflage. Verlag Johann Kleine Vennekate, Lemgo 2009, .

References

Florett RS